Eynatan (also Romanized as Eynātān, ‘Anātān, and Īnātān) is a village in Qaedrahmat Rural District, Zagheh District, Khorramabad County, Lorestan Province, Iran. At the 2006 census, its population was 40, in 8 families.

References 

Towns and villages in Khorramabad County